Onze-Lieve-Vrouwinstituut may refer to:

Onze-Lieve-Vrouwinstituut, a school in the Berchem district of the city of Antwerp, Belgium
Onze-Lieve-Vrouwinstituut, a school in Boom, Belgium

See also
List of schools in Antwerp